Curling is a mainly residential neighbourhood of the city of Corner Brook, Newfoundland and Labrador. It is situated just west of the main part of the city. Located in the Humber Arm of the Bay of Islands, Curling was originally a fishing community. It is the oldest section of Corner Brook.

History
James Cook, the famous British cartographer and explorer, was the first to survey and record the geography of the Bay of Islands. Throughout the summer of 1767, he surveyed most of the area. Copies of the maps he created are displayed at the Captain James Cook Monument in Corner Brook.

Curling used to be known as Birchy Cove; its name was changed in dedication of Rev. J.J. Curling. Curling used to have a hotel and a golf course. Oil tankers are currently in their place.

In 1956, Curling amalgamated with three other communities (Humbermouth, Townsite and Westside) on the south side of the Humber Arm to form the city of Corner Brook.

The Western Star, the main newspaper for the west coast of Newfoundland, was founded in Curling in 1900.

Attractions

Curling is host to the city's yacht club and marina, a local war memorial, as well as a number of businesses, churches, sports sites and residential neighbourhoods. Two public elementary schools, Sacred Heart and J.J. Curling, are also found here.

Within the area is the old Bank of Montreal building. This building opened in 1915 after the original structure burned down in 1913. The bank used the building until 1985. As of 2001, it has been considered a Registered Heritage Structure by the Heritage Foundation of Newfoundland and Labrador.

There are a few trail systems that run through Curling, including a section of the Newfoundland T'Railway.

Bartlett's Point Park is a small day-park located on the waterfront, and features walking trails and a playground.

Transportation

Part of Route 450 travels through Curling on O'Connell Drive before continuing on down the southern shore of the Humber Arm and Bay of Islands.

Curling is included in the Corner Brook Transit public bus service route. It also has its own taxi service, called Birchy Cabs.

See also
 List of communities in Newfoundland and Labrador
 Corner Brook

References

External links
 Corner Brook website

Populated coastal places in Canada
Populated places in Newfoundland and Labrador